The Permanent Representative of Romania to the United Nations is currently Ion Jinga since 4 August 2015. Romania joined the United Nations (UN) on 14 December 1955.

The first person with the diplomatic post was Athanase Joja, who was already appointed with it in 1955. However, Joja and the official Romanian diplomatic delegation for the UN would not arrive in New York City until 20 March 1956. The persons that have been the Permanent Representative of Romania to the United Nations have been the following:

 Athanase Joja (1955–1957)
 Mihai Magheru (1957–1959)
 Silviu Brucan (1959–1961)
 Mihai Haseganu (1961–1966)
 Gheorghe Diaconescu (1966–1971)
 Ion Datcu (1972–1978)
 Teodor Marinescu (1978–1986)
 Petre Tanasie (1987–1990)
 Aurel Dragos Munteanu (1990–1992)
 Mihai Horia Botez (1992–1994)
 Ion Goriță (1994–2000)
 Sorin Ducaru (2000–2001)
 Alexandru Niculescu (2001–2003)
 Mihnea Motoc (2003–2008)
 Simona Miculescu (2008–2015)
 Ion Jinga (2015–present)

See also
 Romania and the United Nations
 Permanent Representative of Moldova to the United Nations

References

External links
  of the Permanent Mission of Romania to the United Nations

 
United Nations
Romania